Rebutia steinbachii, called Steinbach's crown cactus, is a species of cactus in the genus Rebutia, native to Bolivia. It has gained the Royal Horticultural Society's Award of Garden Merit.

Subspecies
The following subspecies are currently accepted:
Rebutia steinbachii subsp. verticillacantha (F.Ritter) Donald ex D.R.Hunt

References

steinbachii
Endemic flora of Bolivia
Plants described in 1931